The Southeast Pacific Basin is an undersea basin.

Oceanic basins of the Southern Ocean